is located at Satsukiyama Park, at the base of Mount Satsuki in Ikeda, Osaka, Japan, opened in April, 1957. The zoo is the municipal zoo of Ikeda.

The zoo is the second smallest zoo (3000 m2) in all zoos belonging to Japanese Association of Zoos and Aquariums (JAZA).

Wombats 
In 1992, wombats were successfully bred at the zoo, which was the first time outside of Australia.

Idol group 
Keeper Girls is a female idol music group created in August 2015. The group belongs to the zoo.

Access
a 15-minute walk from Ikeda Station on the Takarazuka Main Line of Hankyu Railway.

References

External links
Official site
Keeper Girls' official site

Tourist attractions in Osaka
Zoos in Japan